Lubbock Christian University (LCU) is a private Christian university associated with the Churches of Christ and located in Lubbock, Texas. Chartered originally as part of a grade school called Lubbock Christian School in 1954, the institution branched off as a junior college – Lubbock Christian College – in 1957. LCC became a senior college in 1972, then advanced to university status in fall of 1987. LCU has 65 undergraduate degrees. A fall 2015 count showed 1,958 students enrolled at Lubbock Christian University, of which 462 were graduate students.

History
In 1954 the State of Texas approved the operation of a private educational institution for students from kindergarten through college. An elementary school was established that year, and a junior college was added in 1957. F. W. Mattox was the founding president. LCU received accreditation as a senior college in 1972. Advancement to university status came in the fall of 1987. Presidents who have led Lubbock Christian University are F. W. Mattox (1957–1974), W. Joe Hacker (1974–1976), Harvie Pruitt (1976–1982), Steven S. Lemley (1982–1993), L. Ken Jones (1993–2012), L. Timothy Perrin (2012–2019), and Scott McDowell (2020–present).

Housing

Katie Rogers Hall is a women's residence for 250 students. It was built in the 1960s and underwent major renovation in 1999 and again in Summer 2017. The Katie Rogers Courtyard houses forty-eight upperclass women with private bedrooms and semi-private bathrooms.

Johnson Hall is the men's residence and can house nearly two hundred men.  It was renovated in Summer 2018.

Mabee Hall has capacity to house 48 upperclassmen. Residents have private bedrooms and semi-private bathrooms.

The university also offers university apartments for upperclassmen, married students with no children, and graduate students. Apartments are located on the west and east sides of campus.

Campus information

The Mabee Student Union Building (SUB) has a post office, student affairs office, student government office, the Chap Store, and a snack bar.

Built in 1961, the Betty Hancock Campus Center once served as the university's cafeteria. A newer, more contemporary cafeteria, known as "the Caf", has since been added. A parlor is also available for receptions.

The McDonald Moody Auditorium has a seating capacity of 1166 and serves as the venue for daily chapel assemblies.

The Allison Music center is adjacent to the Moody auditorium. The center has rehearsal halls for bands and choruses, 12 practice rooms, and also houses the music professors' offices.

The Rhodes–Perrin Recreation Center (previously known as "Field House") serves as the student recreation center and houses the Ramona Perrin Fitness Center. The building has a volleyball, basketball, futsal and badminton courts, along with a 60-foot free standing rock wall, renovated locker rooms, group fitness studio. The department of Exercise and Sport Sciences has its offices there.

The Mabee American Heritage Center houses the department of history, political science, and English, the Cardwell Lecture Hall, and administrative offices. Other administrative offices are housed in F. W. Mattox Administrative Building. Built in 1958, the Mattox Administrative building was the first permanent brick structure on campus. The 2nd floor of the building contains the offices of the department of Business.

The Mabee Science Laboratory, built in 1970, was extensively renovated and rebuilt, and renamed the Dobbs Center for Business to house the College of Business.

The Ling Science Center houses the department of Natural and Physical Sciences. The building also contains laboratories and equipment rooms.

The Associates Behavioral Science Building was built in 1967 and houses the Department of Behavioral Sciences which include psychology and sociology.

The Maddox-Pugh Educational Center houses the department of Education, a computer lab, several classrooms, and the West Texas Core Knowledge Center.

The C.L. Kay Christian Development Center, built in 1974 (significantly renovated in recent years) houses the Al and Patricia Smith College of Biblical Studies, as well as the Honors College. Bible department

The Diana Ling Center for Academic Achievement was completed in 2007 and houses the Communications, Fine Arts and Chap Radio. The Center for Student Success is also located in this facility.

The Mabee Nursing Center opened in 1994, was recently renamed the Mabee Social Work & Criminal Justice Building.

The Rip Griffin Center (aka "The Rip") houses the university's intercollegiate athletic teams. It can seat up to 1,925 with an additional 565 when floor seating is utilized.

On the north end of campus is the Cardwell Welcome Center. Completed in 2010, the Welcome Center qualified  for a Platinum Certification from the U.S. Green Building Council under its LEED, Leadership in Energy and Environmental Design Green Building Rating System.

The beautiful Talkington Center for Nursing Excellence houses not only the LCU Department of Nursing, but the Covenant School of Nursing as well.  In the west end of the building, the Collier Auditorium seats around 500.

Student life
Although the university is not host to affiliates of national fraternities and sororities, nonetheless Lubbock Christian University has gender-based "Social Clubs". The women's social clubs are Christliche Damen, Kappa Phi Kappa, Lambda Omega Alpha, and Zeta Gamma. The men's social clubs are Koinonia, Kyodai, and  Alpha Chi Delta.

There is also one fraternity on campus, Sub T-16.  The fraternity Sub T-16 has chapters at other churches of Christ-affiliated schools such as Abilene Christian University and Harding University. Sub T-16 fraternity was founded on the campus by F. W. Mattox, who also served as the first president of Lubbock Christian.

The university is also affiliated with several professional organizations including Reserve Officer Training Corps (ROTC), Students in Free Enterprise, and the Student Education Association.

The university's online newspaper is the DusterToday.

LCU also has an a cappella  ensemble called Best Friends. They tour across the country and record studio albums. Several of their alumni have gone on to work for The Acappella Company, an established member of the a cappella  community.

Athletics

The Lubbock Christian athletic teams are called the Chaparrals and Lady Chaps. The university is a member of the NCAA Division II ranks, primarily competing in the Lone Star Conference (LSC) since the 2019–20 academic year. The Chaparrals and Lady Chaps previously had competed in the D-II Heartland Conference from 2013–14 to 2018–19; in the Sooner Athletic Conference (SAC) of the National Association of Intercollegiate Athletics (NAIA) from 1994–95 to 2012–13; and in the Texas Intercollegiate Athletic Association (TIAA) of the NCAA Division III ranks from 1979–80 to 1981–82.

Lubbock Christian competes in 17 intercollegiate varsity sports: Men's sports include baseball, basketball, cross country, golf, soccer, tennis and track & field; while women's sports include basketball, cross country, golf, soccer, softball, tennis, track & field and volleyball; and co-ed sports include cheerleading and eSports.

Women's basketball
On April 4, 2016, the Lady Chaps defeated the Seawolves of the University of Alaska-Anchorage in Indianapolis, Indiana 78–73 to cap an undefeated season and win the NCAA Division II women's basketball championship. The win happened in the first year the Lady Chaps were eligible for NCAA Division II post-season play after more than 30 years of playing in the NAIA.

Notable alumni
 R. Gerald Turner, President of Southern Methodist University
 Larry Hays, retired Texas Tech Red Raiders baseball coach
Matt Martin, baseball coach with the Detroit Tigers
 The Otwell Twins, singers on The Lawrence Welk Show, Amarillo businessmen
 Britt Bonneau, college baseball coach at Abilene Christian
 Randy Velarde, Retired Major League Baseball player
 Rob Evans, former head men's basketball coach, University of Mississippi, and Arizona State University
 Brad Rogers, Football Official with the National Football League
 Marvin Lee Aday, musician and actor – attended briefly in 1965 then transferred to North Texas State College
 L. Timothy Perrin, attorney and sixth LCU president

Gallery

References

External links
 
 Official athletics website

 
1957 establishments in Texas